Ramona and Beezus is a 2010 American family adventure comedy film based on the Ramona series of novels written by Beverly Cleary. It was directed by Elizabeth Allen, co-produced by Dune Entertainment, Di Novi Pictures, and Walden Media, written by Laurie Craig and Nick Pustay, and produced by Denise Di Novi and Alison Greenspan with music by Mark Mothersbaugh. The film stars Joey King and Selena Gomez. Though the film's title is derived from Beezus and Ramona, the first of Cleary's Ramona books, the plot is mostly based on the sequels Ramona Forever and Ramona's World.

Ramona and Beezus was released by Fox 2000 Pictures on July 23, 2010, and grossed $27 million. The film received generally positive reviews from critics, who praised the acting of King and Gomez.

Plot
The adventurous and creative third-grader Ramona Quimby often finds herself in trouble at school and at home, usually with her best friend, Howie. When her father Robert loses his job and the family falls into severe debt, Ramona's efforts to earn money end up backfiring in humorous ways. She repeatedly embarrasses her older sister, Beatrice, calling her by her family nickname, "Beezus", in front of Beatrice's crush, the paperboy Henry.

Although an executive in a company since Beezus's birth, Robert quarrels with Dorothy (his wife and the girls' mother) when he considers pursuing a creative career.

Meanwhile, Ramona's visiting aunt Bea is one of the few who accepts her despite all her eccentricities. After a car-painting accident involving Bea's old flame Hobart, Ramona gives up her money-making schemes. The next day, she ruins her school portrait by cracking a raw egg in her hair and making a face when the photographer asks her to say "Peas" instead of "Cheese". Ramona's worries increase the following day, when her classmate Susan reveals that after her own father lost his job, her parents divorced and her father moved to Tacoma. The news makes Ramona physically sick, and Robert has to pick her up early from school, interfering with a sudden job interview. Instead of being angry, Robert decides to spend the rest of his day drawing a mural with Ramona.

While Ramona and Beezus attempt to make dinner for their parents, the pan catches fire while Beezus is on the phone with Henry. During the ensuing argument, Henry overhears that Beezus loves him. Still upset, Ramona goes to feed her cat Picky-Picky but is devastated to find him dead. The girls' private funeral for their friend helps them reconcile. A job offer for Robert in Oregon leads Ramona's parents to decide to sell their house. As the family touches up the garden during an open house, Ramona inadvertently initiates a water fight with the neighbors, which floods the neighbors' backyard and exposes a box that Hobart buried there years ago. The box contains mementos of Bea and Hobart's teenage romance, and in light of their rekindling relationship, he proposes to her. Hesitantly, Bea accepts, and the family begins planning the impromptu wedding.

Furious her aunt broke her promise not to get "reeled in", Ramona rushes home, seeking solace in the attic. The fragile floorboards break, leaving her legs dangling from the ceiling during the open house. After they clear out, Robert scolds her for her lack of maturity. Feeling unwanted, Ramona decides to run away. Unable to convince her not to leave, her mother helps her pack. Opening the heavy suitcase at a bus stop, Ramona discovers that her mother intentionally made it heavy to keep Ramona from getting far. Inside, Dorothy packed a book of Robert's sketches of Ramona. Her family finds her soon afterward and everyone is happily reunited.

At Bea and Hobart's wedding, Ramona saves the day when she finds the wedding ring Howie dropped. During the reception, Beezus and Henry share a kiss and dance together, risking it as they were moving. Robert gets another job offer, this one at Ramona's school, as Mrs. Meachum recommended him as the new art teacher after she saw the mural that he and Ramona made. Ramona is delighted they will not have to move and that her parents reconcile. Before Bea and Hobart leave for their honeymoon in Alaska, Ramona gives Bea a locket with her school picture, and Bea says Ramona is "extraordinary".

Cast

Production

In 2009, it was announced that Elizabeth Allen would direct a film adaptation of the Ramona series of novels written by Beverly Cleary. The film, Ramona and Beezus, would be released in cinemas on July 23, 2010. Denise Di Novi and Alison Greenspan spent $15 million to produce the film with writers Laurie Craig and Nick Pustay. Filming took place in Vancouver. Fox 2000 Pictures acquired distribution rights to the film. Mark Mothersbaugh composed the music for the film. Dune Entertainment, Walden Media, and Di Novi Pictures co-produced the film.

Release
Ramona and Beezus was released in theaters on July 23, 2010 by 20th Century Fox and Walden Media to 2,719 theaters nationwide. The film was rated G by MPAA, becoming the studio's fourth film to be rated G since 1997's Anastasia. The trailer was released on March 18, 2010, and was shown in theaters along with How to Train Your Dragon, The Last Song, Despicable Me, Toy Story 3, and 20th Century Fox's other films, including Diary of a Wimpy Kid and Marmaduke. The film premiered in New York City on July 20, 2010. It was released in Irish and British cinemas October 22, 2010.

Critical reception
Ramona and Beezus earned generally positive reviews. On the review aggregator website Rotten Tomatoes, 70% of 91 reviews are positive, with an average rating of 6.2/10. The website's consensus reads, "If Ramona and Beezus fails to capture the essence of its classic source material, it's sunny, sweet, and wholesome." On Metacritic, the film holds a score of 56 out of 100, based on 29 reviews. Audiences polled by CinemaScore gave the film a grade "A−".

Eric Snider of Film.com said that "The resulting story is a jumble, and there are too many side characters, but golly if it isn't pretty darned infectious." Jason Anderson of the Toronto Star gave Ramona and Beezus a good review, saying that "[Ramona and Beezus] is a lively affair, largely thanks to the sweet and snappy screenplay by Laurie Craig and Nick Pustay and to the appealing performances by the cast."

Box office
The film opened at #4, grossing under $3 million on its opening day. It brought in $7.8 million during its opening weekend, earning it #6 at the box office. Over its first week, it earned nearly $12.7 million. As of November 20, 2010, its total gross stands at $26.6 million, surpassing its $15 million budget. The film made £84,475 on its first weekend in the UK, debuting at number 14 in the box office chart.

Home media
The film was released on DVD and Blu-ray combo pack on November 9, 2010.

Soundtrack

The accompanying soundtrack album was released on July 28, 2010 by Hollywood Records. The film's soundtrack includes "Live Like There's No Tomorrow", performed by Selena Gomez & the Scene. The song was digitally released as a soundtrack single on July 13, 2010 and serving as a promotional single from the band's second album, A Year Without Rain (2010).

 "Walking on Sunshine" – Aly & AJ
 "Eternal Flame" – The Bangles
 "Peanut Butter Jingle" – Ali Dee and the Deekompressors
 "(Let's Get Movin') Into Action" – Skye Sweetnam featuring Tim Armstrong
 "Here It Goes Again" – OK Go
 "A Place In This World" – Taylor Swift
 "How I Love You" – Rob Laufer
 "Everybody" – Ingrid Michaelson
 "Say Hey (I Love You)" – Michael Franti & Spearhead
 "Live Like There's No Tomorrow" – Selena Gomez & the Scene

See also
 Ramona (1988 TV series)

References

External links
 
 
 

2010s American films
2010s children's comedy films
2010 comedy films
2010s English-language films
2010 films
20th Century Fox films
American children's comedy films
American films with live action and animation
Dune Entertainment films
Fictional duos
Films about families
Films about sisters
Films based on children's books
Films directed by Elizabeth Allen Rosenbaum
Films produced by Denise Di Novi
Films scored by Mark Mothersbaugh
Films set in Portland, Oregon
Films shot in Vancouver
Walden Media films